Willamette Riverkeeper is a non profit organization formed in 1996 in order to protect and restore the Willamette River's water quality and habitat.

Willamette River 
The Willamette River runs through a large stretch of Oregon's Willamette Valley, with the main stem river stretching from south of Eugene to Portland, Oregon. Along its 187 plus miles, the river is impacted by a range of issues, from toxic pollutants and dams on the river's tributaries, to urban development and industrial waste. In addition to pollution, the habitat of the Willamette River was degraded to a significant extend.

Overview
Willamette Riverkeeper is the only organization that works solely to protect and restore the Willamette River's water quality and habitat. Over the years they have advocated, educated, and worked in a hands-on manner to improve conditions along the Willamette - with the support of many members of the general public. From their work on Superfund in Portland Harbor since 1995, to their advocacy for the Willamette Greenway, they have moved the Willamette River's health forward in a way that no other organization, funder, or government entity has.

History
Travis Williams has led the organization since 2000 as Riverkeeper and Executive Director, and the team at WR has made significant strides related to fish passage at the dams on the Willamette River's tributaries, in order to restore naturally reproducing populations of Spring Chinook and Winter Steelhead in the system. In fact, in 2007, Willamette Riverkeeper filed a lawsuit against the US Army Corps of Engineers (Corps) that forced the Corps to complete the Biological Opinion of the Willamette, and to begin work to reduce their impact. This legal action by Willamette Riverkeeper resulted in a settlement completed in 2008 that forced the US Army Corps and others to move forward in a robust fashion to improve fish passage and to restore habitat.

This small non profit has also been responsible for bringing thousands of people to the river to canoe, kayak, paddle board, and swim over the years. Their work on the Willamette Water Trail has drawn thousands to the Willamette. Their signature event, Paddle Oregon, brings hundreds of people to the river every August to canoe, kayak and paddle board. Each day participants learn about the river and its needs. This small non profit continues to have a huge impact with its combination of advocacy, education, hands-on work, and policy expertise.

In 2009, the organization worked hard to reignite the Willamette River Greenway Program by the Oregon Parks and Recreation Department. This effort sought to improve the understanding and stewardship of thousands of acres of public land along the Willamette River. Over the next several years, Willamette Riverkeeper was the lead proponent of protecting existing Greenway Lands, expanding public understanding of the value of public land along the Willamette, and increasing these lands each and every year.

In January 2017, after 16 years of work the Portland Harbor Superfund site's Record of Decision was completed. Willamette Riverkeeper worked tirelessly over the time to push the many responsible parties to take action in regard to the Cleanup, and to support the US Environmental Protection Agency's (EPA) work to complete the Record of Decision.  Finally, after much political opposition, the Record of Decision was finished, and represented a major improvement over the Draft Plan issued but the EPA in June 2016. Travis Williams, the Riverkeeper and Executive Director of the organization has helped to lead the process during that time. Willamette Riverkeeper has been the primary non profit organization that worked to analyze the technical aspects of the cleanup, education the general public about the issue, and had taken thousands of people on the river to see it and learn about its issues since 1996.

References

1996 establishments in Oregon
Willamette River